The 1977 Centennial Cup is the seventh Tier II Junior "A" 1977 ice hockey National Championship for the Canadian Junior A Hockey League.

The Centennial Cup was competed for by the winners of the Western Canadian Champions and the Eastern Canadian Champions.

The finals were hosted by the Prince Albert Raiders in the city of Prince Albert, Saskatchewan.

The Playoffs

Prior to the Regionals
Richmond Sockeyes (PCJHL) defeated Nanaimo Clippers (BCJHL)  3-games-to-none
North York Rangers (OPJHL) defeated Thunder Bay Eagles (TBJHL) 4-games-to-1
Pembroke Lumber Kings (CJHL) defeated La Tuque Wolves (QJAHL) 4-games-to-none
North York Rangers (OPJHL) defeated Guelph Platers (SOJHL) 4-games-to-3
Sydney Millionaires (EJHL) defeated Corner Brook Jr. Royals (WCJHL) 4-games-to-none

MCC Finals

Regional Championships
Manitoba Centennial Cup: Prince Albert Raiders

Abbott Cup: Prince Albert Raiders
Eastern Champions: Pembroke Lumber Kings

Doyle Cup: Calgary Canucks
Anavet Cup: Prince Albert Raiders
Dudley Hewitt Cup: Pembroke Lumber Kings
Callaghan Cup: Charlottetown Islanders

Roll of League Champions
AJHL: Calgary Canucks
BCJHL: Nanaimo Clippers
CJHL: Pembroke Lumber Kings
EJHL: Sydney Millionaires
IJHL: Charlottetown Generals
MJHL: Dauphin Kings
NAHA Champions: Corner Brook Jr. Royals
NBJHL:
OPJHL: North York Rangers
PacJHL: Richmond Sockeyes
QJAHL: La Tuque Wolves
SJHL: Prince Albert Raiders
SOJAHL: Guelph Platers
TBJHL: Thunder Bay Eagles

Awards
Most Valuable Player: Barry Archibald (Prince Albert Raiders)
Top Scorer: Barry Archibald and Al Moore (Prince Albert Raiders)

Related links
Canadian Junior A Hockey League
Royal Bank Cup
Anavet Cup
Doyle Cup
Dudley Hewitt Cup
Fred Page Cup
Abbott Cup
Mowat Cup

External links
Royal Bank Cup Website

1977
Ice hockey competitions in Saskatchewan
Cup
Sport in Prince Albert, Saskatchewan